The Elan Valley is a river valley situated to the west of Rhayader, in Powys, Wales, sometimes known as the "Welsh Lake District".

The valley contains the Elan Valley Reservoirs and Elan Village, designed by architect Herbert Tudor Buckland as part of the same scheme. Elan Village is the only purpose-built Arts and Crafts "Model Village" in Wales.

It is also famous for its picturesque scenery. Over 80% of the valley is designated as Sites of Special Scientific Interest, and a popular cycle trail, the Elan Valley Trail, makes a loop from Rhayader around the reservoirs. Part of the trail overlaps with a spur of National Cycle Route 81 (Lon Cambria).

As of 2015 it is an International Dark Sky Park.

See also
 Elan Valley Reservoirs
 Elan Valley aqueduct
 Elan Valley Railway
 River Elan

External links
 Sustrans Routes2Ride: Cycling in the Elan Valley
 Sustrans map and description for Route 81, Lon Cambria
 Official site by Dŵr Cymru Welsh Water and the Elan Valley Trust
 City council to fund water museum at BBC News, 26 July 2006
 Abandoned communities ..... Elan Valley
 From Shelley to the Dambusters
 www.geograph.co.uk : photos of the Elan Valley and surrounding area
 Photographs of the Elan Valley in Winter from the August 2009 Exhibition, The Beauty of Winter at the Elan Valley Visitor centre

Valleys of Powys
Sites of Special Scientific Interest in Ceredigion
Sites of Special Scientific Interest in Radnor
Elenydd
Cycleways in Wales
Cycleways in Powys
Dark sky preserves in Wales